Port Maitland may refer to:

 Port Maitland, Ontario
 Port Maitland, Nova Scotia